Zaloka is a village in the Municipality of Šentrupert in southeastern Slovenia. The area is part of the historical region of Lower Carniola. The municipality is now included in the Southeast Slovenia Statistical Region. 

The local church is dedicated to Saint Agnes and belongs to the Parish of Šentrupert. It dates to the 16th century.

References

External links
Zaloka at Geopedia

Populated places in the Municipality of Šentrupert